Bagchi is an Indian surname. Bagchi is a Bengali Brahmin surname, Shandilya Gotro, Barendra Brahmin Notable people with the surname include:
 Jatindramohan Bagchi (1878–1948), Bengali poet
 Subroto Bagchi (born 1957), Indian entrepreneur
 Tanishk Bagchi, Indian composer
 Biman Bagchi, Indian scientist
 Amiya Kumar Bagchi, Indian economist
 Rupankar Bagchi, Bengali singer

Indian surnames
Bengali Hindu surnames